Sylloge, from the Ancient Greek συλλογή ("collection"), is a compilation of documents or data. In particular the term may refer to:
 Sylloge Nummorum Graecorum, a project publishing collections of ancient Greek coins
 Sylloge of Coins of the British Isles, a similar project for British coinage of the Anglo-Saxons and Normans
 Lombard syllogae, Anglo-Saxon compilations of inscriptions from Lombard Italy
 Syllogae minores, compilations of ancient Greek poetry